Green Park is a business park near junction 11 of the M4 motorway on the outskirts of the English town of Reading. The park opened in 1999, and is currently owned by Mapletree. The buildings provide  of office space, and in excess of 6,500 people work on site.

The site is bounded by the M4 motorway to the south, the Madejski Stadium and the A33 road to the east, the site of the proposed Green Park Village to the north, and the Reading to Basingstoke railway line to the west. From a local government perspective it is largely located within the borough of Reading, but partly in the civil parish of Shinfield within the borough of Wokingham.

The development has been awarded a national Civic Trust Award for its landscape design, architecture and community involvement.

History

Green Park was developed by Prudential and PRUPIM on what was once an area of low lying and poor quality agricultural land. The fact that the land was prone to flooding necessitated the construction of flood alleviation features, including the central Longwater lake and the realigned Foudry Brook.

The park was opened in February 1999. Initially Cisco Systems committed to taking  of office space, with options on a further . However the bursting of the dot-com bubble in 2001 led to a severe scaling back of Cisco's requirements, and resulted in five of their buildings remaining empty for many years.

In 2014, the park was awarded a Civic Trust Award in the public realm class for its landscape design, architecture and community involvement. Green Park was sold to Mapletree in May 2016 for £560m.

Transport
Bus route Greenwave 50, operated by Reading Buses, connects Green Park to Reading town centre and Reading railway station. Bus route 600, also operated by Reading buses, is a short walk from Green Park and serves a park and ride site at Mereoak south of the M4. Between Reading and Green Park frequencies vary from 4 buses per hour during weekday peak periods to every 45 minutes on Saturdays.

Plans for a Reading Green Park railway station on the Reading–Basingstoke line were first mooted in the mid-2000s. The planning application was approved in April 2015, with construction then expected to start in October 2016. A subsequent delay to the planned electrification of the line beyond 2019 raised fears that it might not be possible to provide a train service to the station on its opening, as the existing diesel trains lacked sufficient acceleration to add an extra stop without reducing line capacity. However, the station is now set to open in early 2023.

Route 23 of the National Cycle Network follows a traffic-free routing through the centre of Green Park, on its way from Reading to Basingstoke.

Green Park wind turbine

The most visible feature of Green Park is an Enercon E-70 wind turbine, adjacent to the M4 motorway, and billed as the UK's most visible turbine. At a wind speed of  the machine generates 2.05 MW of electricity (less for lower wind speeds), which is enough to power around 1,500 homes. It is owned and operated by Ecotricity and was completed in November 2005.

Facilities 
Most of the facilities for Green Park are located on Lime Square, alongside the southern access road to the park and opposite the wind turbine. This offers a day nursery, Childbase, for pre-school children, as well as a play area for children up to 10 years, The Mad House Play & Party World. There is also a Nuffield Health Fitness & Wellbeing Centre, a waterside brasserie called Zest at Lime Square, an Asda Click & Collect, and a WH Smith store.

At the opposite end of the park, 100 Longwater Avenue contains the Byte Café and is home to the Green Park Conference Centre, which hosts meeting rooms and amenities for various sized meetings and conferences.

Sport 
The business park is adjacent to the Madejski Stadium, home of Reading Football Club and the London Irish rugby club. The UK's third largest annual running event, the Reading Half Marathon starts from within the business park, which provides the space needed for pre-race marshalling of the large numbers of competitors, and finishes in the stadium. The business park is also home to the annual Green Park Triathlon which encourages participants to 'Commit to get Fit' and raise money for Comic Relief.

References

External links 
 
 Official website

Buildings and structures completed in 2005
Business parks of England
Economy of Reading, Berkshire
Economy of Berkshire
Recipients of Civic Trust Awards
Borough of Wokingham